Jürgen Straub (born November 3, 1953 in Weitersroda) is a former East German middle distance runner who specialized in the 1500 metres.

Straub's greatest race won him a silver medal at the 1980 Summer Olympics over 1500 metres representing East Germany, behind Sebastian Coe. In that race Straub surprisingly beat 800 metres champion Steve Ovett into third place. Needing a strategy to compete against the two more favoured and fast-finishing British runners, Straub suddenly accelerated with still 700 meters of the race remaining and then steadily increased his pace to the end, overhauled only by Coe and crossing the finishing line in obvious delight. British athletics coach George Gandy later said "If anyone deserved a gold medal, it was Straub". Straub also finished third at the 1977 and 1979 IAAF World Cups.

Straub set his personal best over 1500 m in Potsdam in 1979 with a time of 3:33.68 min. This result places him sixth on the German all-time performers list, behind Thomas Wessinghage, Harald Hudak, Jens-Peter Herold, Dieter Baumann and Rüdiger Stenzel.

Straub was an excellent 3000 m steeplechaser as well, winning three East German national titles over that distance. He competed for the sports club ASK Vorwärts Potsdam during his active career.

References

1953 births
Living people
East German male middle-distance runners
East German male steeplechase runners
Athletes (track and field) at the 1980 Summer Olympics
Olympic athletes of East Germany
Olympic silver medalists for East Germany
Medalists at the 1980 Summer Olympics
Olympic silver medalists in athletics (track and field)
Recipients of the Patriotic Order of Merit in bronze